Michel Adama-Tamboux (December 3, 1928 – March 18, 2018) was a Central African politician and diplomat. He was a President of the National Assembly of the Central African Republic from 1960 to 1966. He was incarcerated by Jean-Bédel Bokassa from 1966 to 1970, and served as the ambassador to the United Nations and Egypt in the 1970s.

He was a member of the political party MESAN.

References

1928 births
2018 deaths
Movement for the Social Evolution of Black Africa politicians
Presidents of the National Assembly (Central African Republic)